The SNCF Class Z 20900 is a double-deck, dual-voltage electric multiple unit trainset that is operated on line C of the Réseau Express Régional (RER), a hybrid suburban commuter and rapid transit system serving Paris and its Île-de-France suburbs.

The 54 four-car trains were built by a consortium of French manufacturer Alstom and Canadian conglomerate Bombardier between 2001 and 2004. The first set was placed into regular passenger service in July 2001.

They are the final equipment produced as part of the Z 2N series of trainsets, which were continuously improved over several generations.

The introduction of the Z 20900 allowed for the oldest equipment on the RER C to be scrapped.

Description
SNCF ordered the Class Z 20900 at the end of 1998 to complete the rolling stock fleet of line C and to replace the last 42 Z 5300 units still in service. The design of 54 four-car trainsets would be based on the earlier Z 20500.They are distinguished in particular by :

large, much more comfortable seats with armrests
their fixed composition at 4 cars
the Alstom OniX traction chain (Onduleur à Intégration eXceptionnelle) based on IGBT components.
the installation of the end-of-evening security system by the possibility of neutralizing the passenger spaces of the power cars
air conditioning and tinted windows
the inter-circulation between the two central car;
luminous and audible warning device for the closing of the doors

The two power cars (ZB) have 82 seats while the two trailers (ZRB) each have 96, as well as a toilet.

History

In order to complete the rolling stock of line C of the RER, and to eliminate from the line the last Z 5300 units still in service, the SNCF ordered new Z 20500 type trainsets at the end of 1998, but with various engine and amenagement upgrades.  These new components were delivered from July 2001 to 2004 and were numbered Z 20900. Their delivery made it possible to eliminate, by shifting, the first sub-series of Z 6100 in the northern suburbs. Between 2001 and 2012, 12 trains were used for the line H.

The OniX traction motor was tested on unit Z 20887-20888(Z20500 series), and is used on all trains of this series. This propulsion system is also used in Z 23500 (TER 2N) and CP 3500.

Formations
, 54 Z20900 trainsets are based at the Les Ardoines SNCF depot.

As shown below, they are formed with two motored cars and two non-powered (trailer) cars (2M2T).

 < or > show a pantograph. Cars 1 and 4 are each equipped with one pantograph.
 Cars 2 and 3 are connected by a gangway.

Fleet
The number of Z 20900 trainsets is 54, numbered 201 A to 254 A (the index "A" indicating asynchronous motorization). All are in service on line C of the Île-de-France RER and are managed by the technical supervision of the line C fleet (SLC).

Listing Fleet Z20900 (in french)

Gallery

References

 
 Bernard Collardey, Les trains de banlieue, tome II, Éd. La Vie du Rail, 1999, 335 p.  
 Le parc Z 20900, on metro-pole.net via web.archive.org,  1er janvier 2008(in french)
 Revue bimestrielle Voies Ferrées, Le matériel moteur de la SNCF, en plusieurs articles sur plusieurs numéros par année. (in french)
 Revue mensuelle Rail Passion, État trimestriel du matériel moteur SNCF, un article par trimestre. (in french)
 Lydie, « https://malignec.transilien.com/2017/10/24/sive/ » [archive], Le blog du RER C, 24 octobre 2017 (consulté le 3 novembre 2017).(in french)
 « https://www.cheminots.net/forum/topic/24494-z-5600-z-8800-z-20500-z-20900-z2n-sujet-officiel/page/82/?tab=comments#comment-821264 » [archive], sur Le web des cheminots , article du 22 avril 2018 (consulté le 24 avril 2018) : « La 1ère à sortir du Technicentre de Saint Pierre des Corps est la Z 20905/06 (203A). Cette dernière est ressortie avec la même livrée qu'une partie des Z2N de la ligne C, à base de rouge "carmillon" de la SNCF et "vif argent" du STIF ».(in french)
 Marc Carémantrant, « Les débuts des Z 20900 » dans Rail Passion no 51, septembre 2001, pp. 12 et 13.(in french)
 Bernard Collardey, Les trains de banlieue, tome II, p. 302.(in french)
 « https://www.cheminots.net/forum/topic/24494-z-5600-z-8800-z-20500-z-20900-z2n-sujet-officiel/page/82/ » [archive], sur Le Web des Cheminots (consulté le 11 juin 2018).(in french)

Electric multiple units of France
Réseau Express Régional multiple units
Z 20900
Double-decker EMUs
Articles containing video clips
25 kV AC multiple units
1500 V DC multiple units of France